Mark Stephen Hughes (born 6 August 1954) is an English-born Australian former professional rugby league footballer who played for Canterbury-Bankstown in the 1970s and 1980s. He is the brother of Garry Hughes and Graeme Hughes, and the uncle of Corey Hughes, Glen Hughes and Steven Hughes.

Playing career
The second eldest of the Hughes brothers to play with Sydney club Canterbury-Bankstown during the 1970s. He competed with his brother Garry for the top pivotal role before moving to the centres. Hughes played  in his sides' 19-4 loss to Eastern Suburbs in the 1974 NSWRFL season's grand final. 

He went on to establish a reputation as a fine centre and lock with a good step and swerve. Under the coaching of Ted Glossop, he was a key member of Canterbury's "Entertainers" era playing reserve in the 1979 grand final loss to St. George, but after playing every game in the 1980 season, he was back at lock in Canterbury's historic 1980 premiership win over Eastern Suburbs at the Sydney Cricket Ground. It was Canterbury's first premiership win since 1942.

In 1981, injuries impacted on the team severely and Hughes played five-eighth on several occasions. He captained Canterbury on six occasions, twice in 1981, and four times in 1982. From 1982 onwards, he was primarily at lock, but in 1983, he was injured for a significant period of time. He played only 11 games in the 1983 season. He played his last game that year as a replacement in his sides' 18-4 preliminary final loss to the Parramatta Eels at the Sydney Cricket Ground. 

He played 174 games, and scored 30 tries, 22 goals and 4 field goals

Post playing
In 1996, Hughes returned to the club in the role of Development Manager. In 2004, he was nominated for the Berries to Bulldogs 70 Year Team of Champions and is a life member of the club.

References

1954 births
Living people
Canterbury-Bankstown Bulldogs players
English emigrants to Australia
English people of Australian descent
English rugby league players
Mark
Rugby league centres
Rugby league five-eighths
Rugby league locks
Rugby league players from Worcestershire